Lord Livingstone 7000 Kandi is a 2015 Indian Malayalam-language fantasy-adventure written and directed by Anil Radhakrishnan Menon. It features an ensemble cast including Kunchako Boban, Bharath, Sunny Wayne, Nedumudi Venu, Chemban Vinod, Reenu Mathews, Jacob Gregory and Sudheer Karamana. The film was produced by Prem Menon under Global United Media. The music was composed by Rex Vijayan, while the background score by Sushin Shyam. The film released on 16 October 2015.

Plot
Philipose John Varkey, a nature enthusiast, sends letters to 100 people to save an unknown tribal village called "7000 Kandi". Various people came, some of them returned because they realised the village is haunted. But six people (Shanumgan Ilangovan, Madhumita Krishnan, C. K. A. K. Menon, Beeran, Prof. N. Neelakandan and Ananthakrishnan Iyer) came to the village with the help of Malavedan. Philipose informs them about a treaty between a landlord and Livingston company 150 years ago. As per treaty, the company has the authority to make the forest an industrial area or a plantation for the next 150 years. If they fail, the forest goes to the government of India. If they succeed in the mission, then they can extend the validity to 350 more years. And now the company becomes aware of some rare earth minerals there and they want to explore it. So they appoint the Bangalore brothers to cut down the trees. Philipose convince others about the importance of saving 7000 Kandi and the tribe who were mistaken as ghosts by the natives. Now with the help of six members, Philipose and the tribals try to stop the Bangalore brothers. They succeed in the mission and Bangalore brothers left the place intact. But later it is revealed that the treaty is valid for four months too and the mission was now to hand it over to an international firm and the tribals should fight with the company to live on their own land and the film ends with Philipose, the tribals and the six battling the company.

Cast
Kunchako Boban as Philipose John Varkey, nature enthusiast
Bharath as Shanumugan Ilangovan aka Sam, adventurer
Sunny Wayne as Beeran, street magician
Reenu Mathews as Madhumita Krishnan aka Madhu, gun-testing expert
Nedumudi Venu as C. K. A. K. Menon, Retired Defence Secretary
Chemban Vinod Jose as Prof. N. Neelakandan
Jacob Gregory as Ananthakrishnan Iyer, chemical engineer
Sudheer Karamana as Malavedan, guide
Mukundan as Leader of tribes
Assim Jamal as Bangalore Brothers
Priya Lal as Meenkanni (Queen of the tribes)
Salaam Bukhari as contractor
Divyadarshan as The tribal Engineer
Raj Kalesh as Kariyan
Sudhi Koppa as Kakapool
Praveen Parameswar as tribal saint
Pushpa Mathews as Ponni
Ambika Rao as Guguthai
Prem Menon as Madhu's Senior Officer
Dinesh Panicker as Ananthu's father-in-law
Vijayan Peringode as Chikanja
Shamsudheen Cherpulassery as himself (street magician)
Subish Sudhi as tribal man
Nebish Benson

Production

This is the third film of Anil after his much acclaimed films North 24 Kaatham (2013) and Sapthamashree Thaskaraha (2014). After telling the story of seven thieves in Sapthamashree Thaskaraha, eight individuals become the key people in Lord Livingstone 7000 Kandi. The first look poster was released online on Friday, 24 April 2015. The poster shows the main eight characters in never-seen looks before. According to actor Bharath, who had completed 15 days of shoot, said in an interview to The Times of India, "The subject touches upon the fight against deforestation and is scripted so well. Everything is unique about the film, be it the title, the narration or the action scenes".

According to the director, the film deals with a fantasy subject - a story that may or may not happen at any period of time. The shooting commenced on 2 May 2015 at Wayanad, Kerala, the film was set and shot at Wayanad, Idukki, Pune and Chennai. The official trailer of the film was released on 2 October.

Box office
The film grossed  in two days from Kerala.

Music

Rex Vijayan provides music for the film with background music by Sushin Shyam. The album consists of four songs composed by Rex Vijayan.The soundtrack album was released on 2 October at Kochi.

References

External links 
 

2015 films
2010s Malayalam-language films
Films shot in Munnar
Films shot in Maharashtra
Films shot in Chennai
Films scored by Sushin Shyam
Films scored by Rex Vijayan